Damerow is a surname. Notable people with the surname include:

Astrid Damerow (born 1958), German politician
Heinrich Philipp August Damerow (1798–1866), German psychiatrist